Synonym
{{columns-list|colwidth=30em|
Australian Elm
Accepted Names: Aphananthe philippinensis and Duboisia myoporoides
Caucasian Elm
Accepted Name: Zelkova carpinifolia
Chaetoptelea mexicana Liebm.
Accepted Name: Ulmus mexicana (Liebm.) Planch.
Indian Elm (Monkey Biscuit Tree)
Accepted Name: Holoptelea integrifolia (Roxb.) Planch.
Microptelea parvifolia (Jacquin) Spach
Accepted Name: Ulmus parvifolia Jacq.
Planera parvifolia (Jacquin) Sweet
Accepted Name: Ulmus parvifolia Jacq.
Ulmus abelicea Sibth. & Sm. in error.
Accepted Name: Zelkova abelicea
Ulmus acuta Dumort.
Accepted Name: Ulmus laevis Pall.
Ulmus adiantifolia Hort. Kirchner
Accepted Name: Ulmus glabra 'Crispa'
Ulmus alba Raf. 
Accepted Name: Ulmus americana L.
Ulmus ambigua Beldie
Accepted Name: ?Ulmus × hollandica?
Ulmus americana  Planch.
Accepted Name: Ulmus americana L.
Ulmus americana  Mast.
Accepted Name: Ulmus × hollandica 'Vegeta'
Ulmus americana aurea (Calmphtout Nursery, Belgium)
Accepted Name: Ulmus glabra 'Lutescens'Ulmus americana macrophylla aurea Späth
Accepted Name: Ulmus × hollandica 'Macrophylla Aurea'Ulmus americana L. var. alba Aiton ,
Accepted Name: Ulmus americana L.Ulmus americana L. var. aspera Chapm. 
Accepted Name: Ulmus americana L.Ulmus americana L. var. aurea Temple, F. L. ex Rehder
Accepted Name: Ulmus americana 'Aurea'Ulmus americana L. var. bartramii Planch. 
Accepted Name: Ulmus americana L.Ulmus americana L. var. floridana (Chapm.) Little 
Accepted Name: Ulmus americana L.Ulmus americana L. var. glabra Planch. 
Accepted Name: Ulmus americana L.Ulmus americana L. var. pendula Aiton 
Accepted Name: Ulmus americana L.Ulmus americana L. var. scabra  Spach 
Accepted Name: Ulmus americana L.Ulmus americana L. var. foliis variegatis Hort. Loudon
Accepted Name: Ulmus americana 'Folia Aurea Variegata'Ulmus americana L. var. glabra Walpers
Accepted Name: Ulmus americana 'Pendula'Ulmus americana L. var. littlefordii Bailey & Bailey
Accepted Name: Ulmus americana 'Littleford'Ulmus americana L. var. molinensis Bailey & Bailey
Accepted Name: Ulmus americana 'Moline'Ulmus americana L. var. pyramidalis Wesmael
Accepted Name: Ulmus americana 'Pyramidata'Ulmus americana L. var. rubra Aiton
Accepted Name: Ulmus rubra Muhl.Ulmus americana f. alba  (Aiton) Fern. 
Accepted Name: Ulmus americana L.Ulmus americana f. ascendens Slavin
Accepted Name: Ulmus americana L.Ulmus americana f. columnaris Rehder
Accepted Name: Ulmus americana L.Ulmus americana f. intercedens Fern. 
Accepted Name: Ulmus americana L.Ulmus americana f. laevior Fern. 
Accepted Name: Ulmus americana L.Ulmus americana L. f. nigrescens Dieck
Accepted Name: Ulmus americana 'Nigricans'Ulmus americana f. pendula (Aiton) Fern. 
Accepted Name: Ulmus americana L.Ulmus americana f. viridis Seym. 
Accepted Name: Ulmus americana L.Ulmus americana L. 'Augustine Ascending'
Accepted Name: Ulmus americana 'Augustine'Ulmus americana L. 'Brandon Ascending'
Accepted Name: Ulmus americana 'Brandon'Ulmus americana L. 'Delaware II'
Accepted Name: Ulmus americana 'Delaware'Ulmus americana L. 'Elm College' 
Accepted Name: Ulmus americana 'College'Ulmus americana L. 'Exhibition Boulevard'
Accepted Name: Ulmus americana 'Exhibition'Ulmus americana L. 'Fastigiata'
Accepted Name: Ulmus americana 'Fiorei'Ulmus americana L. 'Iowa State University'
Accepted Name: Ulmus americana 'Iowa State'Ulmus americana L. 'Klehm' 
Accepted Name: Ulmus americana 'Klehmii'Ulmus americana L. 'Minneapolis Park Board'
Accepted Name: Ulmus americana 'Minneapolis Park'Ulmus americana L. 'Patmore Ascending'
Accepted Name: Ulmus americana 'Patmore'Ulmus androssowii Litw. var. subhirsuta C.K.Schneid.
Accepted Name: Ulmus chumlia Melville & HeybroekUlmus androssowii var. virgata (Planch.) Grudz.
Accepted Name: Ulmus chumlia Melville & HeybroekUlmus anglica Druce
Accepted Name: Ulmus minor 'Atinia'Ulmus antarctica Hort. G.Kirchn.
Accepted Name: Ulmus × viminalis Lodd.Ulmus araxina Takht.
Accepted Name: Ulmus minor Mill.Ulmus asperrima Simonk.
Accepted Name: Ulmus minor 'Atinia'Ulmus aquatica Raf. in error
Accepted Name: Planera aquaticaJ.F.GmelinUlmus atinia Walker
Accepted Name: Ulmus minor 'Atinia'Ulmus aurea Hort. ex. K.Koch
Accepted Name: Ulmus minor Mill.Ulmus basicordata Holl.
Accepted Name: ? (Nomen dubium)Ulmus batavina Koch
Accepted Name: Ulmus × hollandica 'Belgica'Ulmus belgica Weston
Accepted Name: Ulmus × hollandica 'Belgica'Ulmus berardii Simon-Louis
Accepted Name: Ulmus 'Berardii'Ulmus betulaefolia Lodd.
Accepted Name: Ulmus × viminalis Lodd.Ulmus betulifolia Lodd.
Accepted Name: Ulmus × viminalis Lodd.Ulmus betuloides Hort. ex. Steud.
Accepted Name: Ulmus × viminalis Lodd.Ulmus boissieri (Boiss.), Grudz.
Accepted Name: Ulmus minor Mill.Ulmus 'Boulevard'
Accepted Name: Ulmus 'Rosehill'Ulmus brandisiana A. Henry
Accepted Name: Ulmus chumlia Melville & HeybroekUlmus brandisiana C. K. Schneid.
Accepted Name: Ulmus wallichiana subsp. xanthoderma Melville & HeybroekUlmus 'Broadleaf Hybrid' Kammerer
Accepted Name: Ulmus pumila 'Green King'Ulmus bubyriana Litv.
Accepted Name: Ulmus minor 'Umbraculifera'Ulmus 'Buisman' 
Accepted Name: Ulmus minor 'Christine Buisman'Ulmus buxifolia Hort. G.Nicholson
Accepted Name: Ulmus 'Myrtifolia'Ulmus campestreAccepted Name: Ulmus minor Mill.Ulmus campestris Kom.
Accepted Name: Ulmus davidiana var. japonica (Rehder), NakaiUlmus campestris L., Mill., Willk.
Accepted Name: Ulmus glabra Huds.Ulmus campestris  L., Loudon, Planch., Moss
Accepted Name: Ulmus minor 'Atinia'Ulmus campestris Smith
Accepted Name: Ulmus minor 'Plotii'Ulmus campestris acutifolia W.Mast.
Accepted Name: Ulmus 'Acutifolia'Ulmus campestris argenteo-variegata Weston, Krüssmann
Accepted Name: Ulmus 'Argenteo-Variegata'Ulmus campestris bataviana Simon-Louis
Accepted Name: Ulmus × hollandica 'Belgica'Ulmus campestris elegans foliis argenteo variegatis Goeschke
Accepted Name: Ulmus × hollandica 'Tricolor'Ulmus campestris foliis albo punctata C. de Vos
Accepted Name: Ulmus 'Folia Alba-Punctata'Ulmus campestris foliis maculatis Lodd.
Accepted Name: Ulmus 'Argenteo-Variegata'Ulmus campestris foliis rubra de Smet
Accepted Name: Ulmus 'Folia Rubra'Ulmus campestris globosa Behnsch
Accepted Name Ulmus 'Globosa'Ulmus campestris haarlemensis Springer
Accepted Name: Ulmus × hollandica 'Haarlemensis'Ulmus campestris hertfordensis angustifolia Boulger
Accepted Name: Ulmus 'Hertfordensis Angustifolia'Ulmus campestris hertfordensis latifolia Boulger
Accepted Name: Ulmus 'Hertfordensis Latifolia'Ulmus campestris latifolia foliis aureo-variegatis Baudriller
Accepted Name: Ulmus 'Latifolia Aureo-Variegata'Ulmus campestris lutescens Dieck
Accepted Name: Ulmus 'Lutescens'Ulmus campestris marmorata Dieck
Accepted Name: Ulmus 'Marmorata'Ulmus campestris pendula David
Accepted Name: Ulmus pumila 'Pendula'Ulmus campestris pendula W.Mast.
Accepted Name: Ulmus × hollandica 'Smithii'Ulmus campestris pyramidalis (Vicary Gibbs)
Accepted Name: Ulmus 'Pyramidalis'Ulmus campestris rubra Simon-Louis
Accepted Name: Ulmus 'Rubra'Ulmus campestris rueppelli Späth
Accepted Name: Ulmus minor 'Rueppellii'Ulmus campestris viminalis stricta Boulger
Accepted Name: Ulmus × viminalis Lodd.Ulmus campestris virens Loudon
Accepted Name: Ulmus × hollandica 'Virens'Ulmus campestris wendworthiensis Schelle
Accepted Name: Ulmus × hollandica 'Vegeta' (Huntingdon Elm)Ulmus campestris wentworthiensis Späth
Accepted Name: Ulmus × hollandica 'Vegeta' (Huntingdon Elm)Ulmus campestris var. australis Henry
Accepted Name: Ulmus glabra 'Australis'Ulmus campestris var. betulaefolia Loudon
Accepted Name: Ulmus × viminalis Lodd.Ulmus campestris var. chinensis Loudon
Accepted Name: Ulmus parvifolia Jacq.Ulmus campestris var. cicestria (W. A. & J. Mackie nursery, Norwich)
Accepted Name: Ulmus × hollandica 'Vegeta' (Chichester Elm)Ulmus campestris var. clemmeriAccepted Name: Ulmus × hollandica 'Klemmer'Ulmus campestris var. dauvessi Lavallée
Accepted Name: Ulmus × hollandica 'Dauvessei'Ulmus campestris var. dumontii Mottet, Krüssmann
Accepted Name: Ulmus × hollandica 'Dumont'Ulmus campestris var. erecta Loudon
Accepted Name: Ulmus minor 'Erecta'Ulmus campestris var. escaillardii Lavallée
Accepted Name: Ulmus glabra 'Escaillard'Ulmus campestris var. foliis aureis Loudon
Accepted Name: Ulmus 'Folia Aurea'Ulmus campestris var. glabra Hartig, Planch., Asch. & Graebn.
Accepted Name: Ulmus minor Mill.Ulmus campestris var. gracilis monstrosa Lavallee
Accepted Name: Ulmus minor 'Sarniensis'Ulmus campestris var. japonica Rehder
Accepted Name: Ulmus davidiana var. japonica (Rehder), NakaiUlmus campestris var. laciniatus Mathieu
Accepted Name: Ulmus glabra 'Crispa'Ulmus campestris var. laevis F.Schmidt
Accepted Name: Ulmus davidiana var. japonica (Rehder), NakaiUlmus campestris var. laevis Spach, Planch.
Accepted Name: Ulmus minor Mill.Ulmus campestris Huds. var. microphylla Boiss.
Accepted Name: Ulmus minor Mill.Ulmus campestris var. microphylla pendula Hartwig & Rumpler
Accepted Name: Ulmus × viminalis Lodd.Ulmus campestris var. modiolina Dumont de Courset
Accepted Name: Ulmus × hollandica 'Modiolina'Ulmus campestris var. monumentalis Rinz. 
Accepted Name: Ulmus minor Mill.Ulmus campestris var. myrtifolia G.Nicholson
Accepted Name: Ulmus 'Myrtifolia'Ulmus campestris var. nuda subvar. fastigiata Dampieri Vilv.
Accepted Name: Ulmus × hollandica 'Dampieri'Ulmus campestris var. nuda subvar. fastigiata oxfortii Wesmael
Accepted Name: Ulmus minor 'Sarniensis'Ulmus campestris var. nuda subvar. incisa Vilv. Wesmael
Accepted Name: Ulmus × viminalis Lodd.Ulmus campestris var. nuda subvar. microphylla laciniata Vilv.
Accepted Name: Ulmus minor 'Laciniata'Ulmus campestris var. pumila (L.), Maxim.
Accepted Name: Ulmus pumila  L.Ulmus campestris var. pumila Ledeb.
Accepted Name: Ulmus pumila L.Ulmus campestris var. purpurascens Lavallee
Accepted Name: 'Purpurascens'Ulmus campestris var. rotundifolia G.Nicholson & Mottet
Accepted Name: Ulmus 'Rotundifolia'Ulmus campestris var. rubescens Schwerin
Accepted Name: Ulmus laevis 'Colorans'Ulmus campestris var. stricta Audibert
Accepted Name: Ulmus × viminalis Lodd.Ulmus campestris var. variegata nova G.Nicholson
Accepted Name: Ulmus 'Variegata Nova'Ulmus campestris var. virginalis Lavallée
Accepted Name: Ulmus × viminalis Lodd.Ulmus campestris var. vulgaris Shiras.
Accepted Name: Ulmus davidiana var. japonica (Rehder), NakaiUlmus campestris f. fol. argenteo-marmoratis Dippel
Accepted Name: Ulmus 'Marmorata'Ulmus campestris f. fol. picturatis Dippel
Accepted Name: Ulmus minor 'Picturata'Ulmus campestris f. microphylla albo-dentata Dippel
Accepted Name: Ulmus glabra 'Albo-Dentata'Ulmus campestris f. rufa Dieck
Accepted Name: Ulmus 'Rufa'Ulmus campestris 'Betulinoides' 
Accepted Name: Ulmus × viminalis Lodd.Ulmus campestris 'Biltil' in error
Accepted Name: Ulmus minor 'Biltii'Ulmus campestris 'Cochleata' 
Accepted Name: Ulmus minor 'Cucullata'Ulmus campestris 'Klemmer' 
Accepted Name: Ulmus 'Klemmer'Ulmus campestris 'Lutescens'
Accepted Name: Ulmus glabra 'Lutescens'Ulmus campestris 'Microphylla Purpurea' 
Accepted Name: Ulmus minor 'Microphylla Purpurea'Ulmus campestris 'Microphylla Rubra' 
Accepted Name: Ulmus minor 'Microphylla Rubra'Ulmus campestris 'Pendula' 
Accepted Name: Ulmus × hollandica 'Smithii'Ulmus campestris 'Wentworthii' 
Accepted Name: Ulmus × hollandica 'Vegeta' (Huntingdon Elm)Ulmus canadiensis Hort.
Accepted Name: Ulmus × hollandica 'Vegeta'Ulmus canescens Melville
Accepted Name: Ulmus minor Mill.Ulmus carpinifolia Gled.
Accepted Name: Ulmus minor Mill.Ulmus carpinifolia Gled. var. glandulosa Lindl.
Accepted Name: Ulmus  minor 'Glandulosa'Ulmus carpinifolia var. gracilis Krüssmann
Accepted Name: Ulmus minor 'Umbraculifera Gracilis'Ulmus carpinifolia var. horsholmii Melville
Accepted Name: Ulmus minor 'Hoersholmiensis'Ulmus carpinifolia var. suberosa (Moench) Rehder
Accepted Name: Ulmus minor Mill.Ulmus carpinifolia 'Dampier' 
Accepted Name: Ulmus × hollandica 'Dampieri'Ulmus carpinifolia 'Hoersholm' 
Accepted Name: Ulmus minor 'Hoersholmiensis'Ulmus carpinifolia 'Hoersholmensis'
Accepted Name: Ulmus minor 'Hoersholmiensis'Ulmus carpinifolia 'Hoersholmii' 
Accepted Name: Ulmus minor 'Hoersholmiensis'Ulmus carpinifolia 'Microphylla Pendula'
Accepted Name: Ulmus minor 'Sarniensis'Ulmus cavaleriei H.Léveillé in error
Accepted Name: Pteroceltis tatarinowii Maxim.Ulmus celtidea Litvinov
Accepted Name: Ulmus laevis var. celtidea  RogowiczUlmus 'Charisma'
Accepted Name: Ulmus 'Morton Glossy' = Ulmus chinensis Persoon
Accepted Name: Ulmus parvifolia Jacq.Ulmus ciliata Ehrh.
Accepted Name: Ulmus laevis Pall.Ulmus cinerea G.Kirchn.
Accepted Name: Ulmus glabra 'Nigra'Ulmus cinerea Leroy
Accepted Name: Ulmus × hollandica 'Cinerea'Ulmus communis Carrière?
Accepted Name: Ulmus glabra Huds.Ulmus communis ornata Carrière (in error)
Accepted Name: Ulmus laevis 'Ornata'Ulmus coreana Nakai
Accepted Name: Ulmus parvifolia Jacq.Ulmus coreana var. laevigata Nakai
Accepted Name: Ulmus parvifolia Jacq.Ulmus coreana var. lanceolata Nakai
Accepted Name: Ulmus parvifolia Jacq.Ulmus coritana Melville
Accepted Name: Ulmus minor Mill.Ulmus corylacea Dumrt.
Accepted Name: Ulmus glabra Huds.Ulmus corylifolia Boreau
Accepted Name: Ulmus glabra Huds.Ulmus corylifolia Host.
Accepted Name: Ulmus glabra Huds.Ulmus corylifolia Zapal.
Accepted Name: Ulmus glabra 'Cornuta'Ulmus cracoviensis Zapal.
Accepted Name: Ulmus minor Mill.Ulmus crenata Hort. Paris.
Accepted Name: Zelkova crenataUlmus crispa  Willd. 
Accepted Name: Ulmus rubra Muhl.Ulmus dalmatica Baldacci
Accepted Name: Ulmus minor Mill.Ulmus dampieri 'Wredei' 
Accepted Name: Ulmus × hollandica 'Wredei'Ulmus dampieri var. wredei Juhlke
Accepted Name: Ulmus × hollandica 'Wredei'Ulmus davidiana var. japonica f. suberosa Nakai
Accepted Name: Ulmus × mesocarpa M. Kim & S. LeeUlmus davidiana var. levigata C.K.Schneid
Accepted Name: Ulmus davidiana var. japonica (Rehder), NakaiUlmus davidiana var. mandshurica Svorts.
Accepted name: Ulmus davidiana var. davidiana L. K. FuUlmus davidiana var. mandshurica var. pubescens Skvorts.
Accepted Name: Ulmus davidiana Planch.Ulmus davidiana var. pubescens Svorts.
Accepted name: Ulmus davidiana var. davidiana L. K. FuUlmus 'De Dumont' 
Accepted Name: Ulmus × hollandica 'Dumont'Ulmus 'Delaware I' 
Accepted Name: Ulmus 'Urban'Ulmus 'Delaware II' 
Accepted Name: Ulmus americana 'Delaware'Ulmus densa Litv. 
Accepted Name: Ulmus minor Mill.Ulmus densa var. bubyriana Späth
Accepted Name: Ulmus minor 'Umbraculifera'Ulmus dentata Raf.
Accepted Name: Ulmus americana L.Ulmus denudata Reichenbach
Accepted Name: Ulmus minor Mill.Ulmus dignatusAccepted Name: ? (Nomen dubium)Ulmus dimidiata  Raf. 
Accepted Name: Ulmus rubra Muhl.Ulmus dippeliana f. muscaviensis C.K.Schneid.
Accepted Name: Ulmus × hollandica 'Muscaviensis'Ulmus divaricata C. H. Mull.
Accepted Name: Ulmus serotina Sarg.Ulmus diversifolia Melville
Accepted Name: Ulmus minor Mill.Ulmus dowei Baudriller
Accepted Name: Ulmus glabra 'Dovaei'Ulmus effusa Willd., Loudon, Willk., Fliche
Accepted Name: Ulmus laevis Pall,Ulmus effusa Sibth.
Accepted Name: Ulmus glabra Huds.Ulmus effusa rubescens Herder 
Accepted Name: Ulmus laevis 'Colorans'Ulmus effusa f. aureo-variegataAccepted Name: Ulmus laevis 'Aureo-Variegata'Ulmus effusa f. punctata Schelle
Accepted Name: Ulmus laevis 'Punctata'Ulmus elliptica Anon.
Accepted name: Ulmus rubra Muhl.Ulmus elliptica Koch
Accepted Name: Ulmus glabra Huds.Ulmus erosa sensu Wall.
Accepted Name: Ulmus wallichiana Planch.Ulmus erotinaAccepted Name: ? (Nomen dubium)Ulmus erythrocarpa W.C.Cheng
Accepted Name: Ulmus szechuanica FangUlmus excelsa Borkh.
Accepted Name: Ulmus glabra Huds.Ulmus exoniensis Hortr. ex. Loudon
Accepted Name: Ulmus 'Exoniensis'Ulmus expansa Rota
Accepted Name: Ulmus glabra Huds.Ulmus fastigiata Audibert
Accepted Name: Ulmus minor 'Stricta'Ulmus fastigiata Loudon
Accepted Name: Ulmus 'Exoniensis'Ulmus 'Fastigiata Aurea' 
Accepted Name: Ulmus × hollandica 'Wredei'Ulmus 'Fastigiata Macrophylla' 
Accepted Name: Ulmus glabra Huds.Ulmus 'Fastigiata Plumosa' 
Accepted Name: Ulmus 'Exoniensis'Ulmus ferruginea W.C.Cheng
Accepted Name: Ulmus castaneifolia HemsleyUlmus 'Field's New Hybrid Elm' 
Accepted Name: Ulmus pumila 'Green King'Ulmus floridana Chapm. 
Accepted Name: Ulmus americana L.Ulmus foliaceae Gilib., Sarg.
Accepted Name: Ulmus minor Mill.Ulmus foliaceae var. amplifoliaAccepted Name: Ulmus minor 'Amplifolia'Ulmus foliaceae var. umbraculifera (Trautv.) Rehder
Accepted Name: Ulmus minor 'Umbraculifera'Ulmus fordii Hort.
Accepted Name: Ulmus 'Exoniensis'Ulmus forficata Presl.
Accepted Name: ? Ulmus glabra ?Ulmus fulva Michx., Loudon, Bentley & Trimen, Sarg.
Accepted Name: Ulmus rubra Muhl.Ulmus fulva Hort. var. alba G.Kirchn.
Accepted Name: Ulmus × hollandica 'Alba'Ulmus fulva pendula Meehan
Accepted Name: Ulmus americana 'Beebe's Weeping'Ulmus fungosa Hort. ex. Dum. Cours.
Accepted Name: Ulmus minor Mill.Ulmus gallica A. Chev.
Accepted Name: ? (Nomen dubium)Ulmus georgica Schchian
Accepted Name:  Ulmus minor Mill.Ulmus germanica Hartig.
Accepted Name:  Ulmus minor Mill.Ulmus 'Giant'
Accepted Name: Ulmus × hollandica 'Vegeta'Ulmus 'Gigantea' 
Accepted Name: Ulmus × hollandica 'Major'Ulmus glabra (NOT Huds.) Ley, Smith, Loudon, Rchb., Willk., C. K. Schneid.
Accepted Name: Ulmus minor Mill.Ulmus glabra viminalisAccepted Name: Ulmus × viminalis Lodd.Ulmus glabra Mill. var. glandulosa Lindl.
Accepted Name: Ulmus  minor 'Glandulosa'Ulmus glabra var. minor Ley
Accepted Name: Ulmus minor 'Plotii'Ulmus glabra var. scampstoniensis G.Kirchn.
Accepted Name: ?Ulmus × hollandica? 'Scampstoniensis'Ulmus glabra 'Bush' 
Accepted Name: Ulmus glabra 'Nana'Ulmus glabra 'Cinerea'
Accepted Name: Ulmus glabra 'Nigra' or Ulmus × hollandica 'Cinerea'Ulmus glabra 'Exoniensis'
Accepted Name: Ulmus 'Exoniensis'Ulmus glandulosa Hort. ex Dippel
Accepted Name: Ulmus minor Mill.Ulmus glandulosa Lindley
Accepted Name: Ulmus  minor 'Glandulosa'Ulmus globifera Hartig.
Accepted Name:  Ulmus minor Mill.Ulmus glutinosa Willd.
Accepted Name: ? Ulmus glabraUlmus gobicus Anon.
Accepted Name: Ulmus pumila L.Ulmus gracilis Hort. G.Kirchn.
Accepted Name: Ulmus × viminalis Lodd.Ulmus grandifolia Hayne
Accepted Name: Ulmus minor Mill.Ulmus grossheimii Takht.
Accepted Name: Ulmus minor Mill.Ulmus Heyderi Späth
Accepted Name: Ulmus rubra Muhl.Ulmus hillieri Hort.
Accepted Name: Ulmus × hollandica 'Hillieri'Ulmus hollandica var. angustifolia Weston
Accepted Name: Ulmus × hollandica 'Angustifolia'Ulmus hookeriana Planch.
Accepted Name: Ulmus lanceifolia Roxburgh ex Wall.Ulmus humilis Amman ex Steud.
Accepted Name: Ulmus pumila L.Ulmus huntingdonensis Dieck
Accepted Name: Ulmus × hollandica 'Vegeta' (Huntingdon Elm)Ulmus huntingdonii Hort. Rehder
Accepted Name: Ulmus × hollandica 'Vegeta' (Huntingdon Elm)Ulmus 'Ieplaan'
Accepted Name: Ulmus 'Den Haag'Ulmus inflexa (Hayne) Sloboda
Accepted Name: Ulmus glabra Huds.Ulmus integrifolia Roxb. in error.
Accepted Name: Holoptelea integrifolia (Roxb.) Planch. ('Indian Elm' "Ulmus integrifolia")Ulmus japonica (Rehder), Sarg. 
Accepted Name: Ulmus davidiana var. japonica (Rehder), NakaiUlmus japonica Sieber
Accepted Name: Ulmus parvifolia JacquinUlmus japonica var. levigata C.K.Schneid.
Accepted Name: Ulmus davidiana var. japonica (Rehder), NakaiUlmus 'Klemmer Rouge' 
Accepted Name: Ulmus 'Klemmer'Ulmus klemeri Späth
Accepted Name: Ulmus 'Klemmer'Ulmus koopmannii Späth
Accepted Name: ?Ulmus 'Koopmannii'Ulmus kunmingensis W.C.Cheng
Accepted Name: Ulmus changii var. kunmingensis W. C. ChengUlmus laciniata f. holophylla Nakai
Accepted Name: Ulmus laciniata (Trautv.), MayrUlmus laevigata Royle 
Accepted Name: Ulmus villosa Brandis ex GambleUlmus laevis Hooker & Arnott
Accepted Name: Ulmus minor Mill.Ulmus laevis Pall. var. celtidea Rogow.
Accepted Name: Ulmus laevis Pall.Ulmus laevis Pall. var. simplicidens (E. Wolf) Grudz.
Accepted Name: Ulmus laevis Pall.Ulmus lancaeafolia Roxburgh & Wall.
Accepted Name: Ulmus lanceifolia Roxburgh ex Wall.Ulmus lancifolia Roxburgh
Accepted Name: Ulmus lanceifolia Roxburgh & Wall.Ulmus lasiophylla (C.K.Schneid.) W.C.Cheng
 Accepted Name: Ulmus bergmanniana var. lasiophylla C.K.Schneid.Ulmus latifolia Persoon
Accepted Name: Ulmus minor Mill.Ulmus lesueurii Standl. in error
Accepted Name: Ostrya virginiana (Mill.) K. KochUlmus leucocarpa Schur.
Accepted Name: Ulmus glabra Huds.Ulmus libero-rubra Planch.
Accepted Name: Ulmus glabra 'Rubra'Ulmus Ludlow Elm
Accepted Name: Ulmus  minor 'Glandulosa'Ulmus macrocarpa var. mandshurica Skvortsov
Accepted Name: Ulmus macrocarpa var. macrocarpa L. K. FuUlmus macrocarpa var. mongolica Liou & Li
Accepted Name: Ulmus macrocarpa var. macrocarpa L. K. FuUlmus macrocarpa var. nana  Liou & Li
Accepted Name: Ulmus macrocarpa var. macrocarpa L. K. FuUlmus macrophylla Mill.
Accepted Name: Ulmus glabra Huds.Ulmus macrophylla Nakai
Accepted Name: Ulmus macrocarpa var. macrocarpa L. K. FuUlmus major Sm.
Accepted Name: Ulmus glabra Huds.Ulmus major Hohen. var. heterophylla Maxim.
Accepted Name: Ulmus laciniata (Trautv.), MayrUlmus major Hollandica, angustis & magis acuminatis sammaris, folio latissimo scabro, eleganter variegato Mill.
Accepted Name: Ulmus × hollandica 'Eleganto-Variegata'Ulmus major var. daveyi Henry
Accepted Name: Ulmus × hollandica 'Daveyi'Ulmus 'Malines' 
Accepted Name: Ulmus minor 'Latifolia'Ulmus manshurica Nakai
Accepted Name: Ulmus pumila  L.Ulmus 'Masters's Twiggy'
Accepted Name: Ulmus × viminalis Lodd.Ulmus media Melville
Accepted Name: Ulmus minor Mill.Ulmus micrantha Kitt.
Accepted Name: Ulmus minor Mill.Ulmus microphylla Mill.
Accepted Name: Ulmus minor Mill.Ulmus microphylla Pers.
Accepted Name: Ulmus minor Mill.Ulmus microphylla pendula G.Kirchn.
Accepted Name: Ulmus minor 'Sarniensis'Ulmus Midlands Elm
Accepted Name: Ulmus × hollandica 'Elegantissima' Horw.Ulmus minor foliis flavescentibus Mill.
Accepted Name: Ulmus 'Louis van Houtte'Ulmus minor subsp. canescens (Melville) Browicz & Ziel.
Accepted Name: Ulmus minor Mill.Ulmus minor Mill. subsp. angustifolia (Weston) Stace
Accepted name: Ulmus minor 'Stricta'Ulmus minor var. cornubiensis Richens
Accepted Name: Ulmus minor 'Stricta'Ulmus minor Mill. var. goodyeri Melville
Accepted name: Ulmus minor 'Goodyeri'Ulmus minor var. suberosa (Moench) Rehder
Accepted Name: Ulmus minor Mill.Ulmus minor var. vulgaris Richens
Accepted Name: Ulmus minor 'Atinia'Ulmus minor subsp. minor  Richens
Accepted name: Ulmus minor Mill.Ulmus minor subsp. plotii (Mill.) Richens
Accepted name: Ulmus minor 'Plotii'Ulmus minor subsp. sarniensis  Stace
Accepted name: Ulmus minor 'Sarniensis'Ulmus minor 'Cochleata' Cornelis de Vos
Accepted Name: Ulmus minor 'Cucullata'Ulmus minor 'Italica' 
Accepted Name: Ulmus 'Australis'Ulmus minor 'Koopmannii' 
Accepted Name: Ulmus 'Koopmannii'Ulmus minor 'Webbiana' 
Accepted Name: Ulmus 'Webbiana'Ulmus modiolina Dum. Cours.
Accepted Name: Ulmus × hollandica 'Modiolina'Ulmus mollifolia Marshall 
Accepted Name: Ulmus americana L.Ulmus montana Stokes, Smith, Loudon, Mathieu, With.
Accepted Name: Ulmus glabra Huds. Loudon
Accepted Name: Ulmus 'Exoniensis' Späth
Accepted Name: Ulmus glabra 'Atropurpurea' Schelle (in error)
Accepted Name: Ulmus 'Louis van Houtte' Hort.
Accepted Name: Ulmus glabra 'Camperdownii' Hort. Schelle
Accepted Name: Ulmus × viminalis Lodd. var. australis Hort. Loudon
Accepted Name: Ulmus 'Australis'Ulmus montana var. belgicaAccepted Name: Ulmus × hollandica 'Belgica'Ulmus montana var. corylifolia Zapal.
Accepted Name: Ulmus glabra 'Cornuta'Ulmus montana var. dauvessei G.Nicholson
Accepted Name: Ulmus × hollandica 'Dauvessei'Ulmus montana var. decumbens W.Mast.
Accepted Name: Ulmus glabra 'Horizontalis'Ulmus montana var. etrusca G.Nicholson
Accepted Name: Ulmus × elegantissimaUlmus montana var. fastigiata aurea Hort. G.Nicholson
Accepted Name: Ulmus × hollandica 'Wredei'Ulmus montana var. gigantea Hort. Kirchner
Accepted Name: Ulmus × hollandica 'Major'Ulmus montana var. laciniata Trautv.
Accepted Name: Ulmus laciniata (Trautv.), MayrUlmus montana var. macrophylla aurea Bean
Accepted Name: Ulmus × hollandica 'Macrophylla Aurea'Ulmus montana var. macrophylla fastigiata Hort. G.Nicholson 
Accepted Name: ?Ulmus × hollandica 'Major'Ulmus montana var. major W.Mast.
Accepted Name: Ulmus × hollandica 'Superba'Ulmus montana var. pendula Lodd.
Accepted Name: Ulmus glabra 'Horizontalis'Ulmus montana var. pendula G.Kirchn.
Accepted Name: Ulmus glabra 'Camperdownii'Ulmus montana var. pendula camperdownii Hort.
Accepted Name: Ulmus glabra 'Camperdownii'Ulmus montana var. pendula macrophylla Maxwell
Accepted Name: Ulmus glabra 'Pendula Macrophylla'Ulmus montana var. pendula variegata Hort.
Accepted Name: Ulmus glabra 'Pendula Variegata'Ulmus montana var. pyramidalis Lavallée
Accepted Name: Ulmus × hollandica 'Dampieri'Ulmus montana var. ramulosa Booth
Accepted Name: Ulmus glabra 'Ramulosa'Ulmus montana var. rugosa W.Mast.
Accepted Name: Ulmus glabra 'Rugosa'Ulmus montana var. smithii Hort.
Accepted Name: Ulmus × hollandica 'Smithii'Ulmus montana var. superba Morren
Accepted Name: Ulmus × hollandica 'Superba'Ulmus montana var. variegata Loudon
Accepted Name: Ulmus glabra 'Albo-Variegata'
Ulmus montana f. fastigiata plumosa Hort. Schelle
Accepted Name: Ulmus 'Exoniensis'
Ulmus montana 'Parasol' 
Accepted Name: Ulmus glabra 'Horizontalis'
Ulmus montana 'Pendula' 
Accepted Name: Ulmus glabra 'Horizontalis'
Ulmus monterreyensis Mull.
Accepted Name: Ulmus crassifolia Nutt.
Ulmus 'Monument'
Accepted Name: Ulmus minor 'Sarniensis'
Ulmus monumentalis Rinzer ex Dippel
Accepted Name: Ulmus minor Mill.
Ulmus Mulberry-leafed Elm
Accepted name: Ulmus minor Mill.
Ulmus multinervis W.C.Cheng
Accepted Name: Ulmus castaneifolia Hemsley
Ulmus multinervosa C.H.Mull.
Accepted Name: Ulmus serotina Sarg.
Ulmus myrtifolia purpurea de Smet
Accepted Name: Ulmus minor 'Purpurascens'
Ulmus nana Borckh.
Accepted Name: Ulmus minor Mill.
Ulmus nemoralis Ait. in error
Accepted Name: Zelkova carpinifolia (Pall.) Dippel
Ulmus nemorosa Borckh.
Accepted Name: Ulmus minor Mill.
Ulmus 'Neosho' 
Accepted Name: Ulmus pumila 'Green King'
Ulmus nepalensis Anon. (nomen dubium)
Accepted Name: ?
Ulmus nitens Moench
Accepted Name: Ulmus minor Mill.
Ulmus nitens var. hunnybunii Moss
Accepted Name: Ulmus minor 'Hunnybunii'
Ulmus nitens var. pendula Rehder
Accepted Name: Ulmus minor Mill.
Ulmus nitens var. sowerbyi Moss
Accepted Name: Ulmus minor 'Sowerbyi'
Ulmus nitens var. wheatleyi Simon-Louis
Accepted Name: Ulmus minor 'Sarniensis'
Ulmus nitida Beldie
Accepted Name: Ulmus minor Mill.
Ulmus nuda Ehrh.
Accepted Name: Ulmus glabra Huds.
Ulmus obovata Raf.
Accepted Name: Ulmus americana L.
Ulmus oblongata Koch, (Hayne) Sloboda
Accepted Name: Ulmus glabra 'Oblongata'
Ulmus oblongoovata Simkovics
Accepted Name: Ulmus minor Mill.
Ulmus orbiculariovata Simkovics
Accepted Name: Ulmus minor Mill.
Ulmus octandra Schkuhr
Accepted Name: Ulmus laevis Pall.
Ulmus 'Ohio Hybrid' 
Accepted Name: Ulmus 'Urban'
Ulmus ontariensis Hort. ex. Steud.
Accepted Name: ? (Nomen dubium)
Ulmus opaca Nutt.
Accepted Name: Ulmus crassifolia Nutt.
Ulmus ovata
Accepted Name: ? (Nomen dubium)
Ulmus parvifolia Hayne
Accepted Name: Ulmus minor Mill.
Ulmus parvifolia Lindley
Accepted Name: Ulmus minor Mill.
Ulmus parvifolia Maxim., Franch. et Savatier, Forbes & Hemsl., Shiras.
Accepted Name: Ulmus parvifolia Jacq.
Ulmus parvifolia corticosa
Accepted Name: Ulmus parvifolia 'Cork Bark'
Ulmus parvifolia f. pendens
Accepted Name: Ulmus parvifolia 'Pendens'
Ulmus parvifolia f. sempervirens
Accepted Name: Ulmus parvifolia 'Pendens'
Ulmus parvifolia 'Brea'
Accepted Name: Ulmus parvifolia 'Drake'
Ulmus parvifolia 'Evergreen'
Accepted Name: Ulmus parvifolia 'Sempervirens'
Ulmus parvifolia 'Microphylla'
Accepted Name: Ulmus parvifolia 'Hokkaido'
Ulmus parvifolia 'Pygmaea'
Accepted Name: Ulmus parvifolia 'Hokkaido'
Ulmus parvifolia 'True Green'
Accepted Name: Ulmus parvifolia 'Sempervirens'
Ulmus pedunculata Foug.
Accepted Name: Ulmus laevis Pall.
Ulmus pedunculata Foug. var. erubescens Elwes
Accepted Name: Ulmus laevis 'Colorans'
Ulmus pendula W.Mast. NOT Willd.
Accepted Name: Ulmus × hollandica 'Smithii'
Ulmus pendula Willd.
Accepted Name: Ulmus americana L.
Ulmus pendulina Sinclair
Accepted Name: Ulmus glabra 'Horizontalis'
Ulmus petropolitana Gdgr.
Accepted Name: Ulmus laevis Pall.
Ulmus pilifera Borbás
Accepted Name: Ulmus minor 'Atinia'Ulmus pinguis Raf.
Accepted Name: Ulmus rubra Muhl.Ulmus pinnato-ramosa Dieck
Accepted Name: Ulmus pumila 'Turkestan'Ulmus pinnato-ramosa f. aurescens Dieck
Accepted Name: Ulmus pumila 'Aurescens'Ulmus pitteursii pendula C. de Vos in error.
Accepted Name: Zelkova × verschaffeltiiUlmus plotii Druce
Accepted Name: Ulmus minor 'Plotii'Ulmus planifolia Hort. ex Loudon
Accepted Name: Ulmus 'Planifolia'Ulmus plumosa C. de Vos
Accepted Name: Ulmus 'Exoniensis'Ulmus plumosa foliis variegatis C. de Vos
Accepted Name: Ulmus 'Exoniensis'Ulmus pluridensis Andronov
Accepted Name: Ulmus minor Mill.Ulmus plurinervaAccepted Name: ? (Nomen dubium)Ulmus podolica (Wilcz.) Klok.
Accepted Name: Ulmus glabra Huds.Ulmus podolica Zapal.
Accepted Name: Ulmus minor Mill.Ulmus polygama in error
Accepted Name: Zelkova carpinifoliaUlmus popovii Giga.
Accepted Name: Ulmus glabra Huds.Ulmus praestans Schoch
Accepted Name: Ulmus × hollandica 'Superba'Ulmus 'Primus'
Accepted Name: Ulmus 'Improved Coolshade'Ulmus procera 'Christine Buisman' 
Accepted Name: Ulmus minor 'Christine Buisman'Ulmus procera 'Silvery Gem' 
Accepted Name: Ulmus 'Silvery Gem'Ulmus procera propendens (Lombarts)
Accepted Name: ?Ulmus × hollandica or Ulmus minor? 'Lombartsii'Ulmus propinqua Koidz.
Accepted Name: Ulmus davidiana var. japonica (Rehder), NakaiUlmus pseudosuberosa Blocki
Accepted Name: Ulmus minorMill.Ulmus pubescens Popichal
Accepted Name: Ulmus minor Mill.Ulmus pubescens Sudw., Pinchot
Accepted Name: Ulmus rubra Muhl.Ulmus pubescens Walter
Accepted Name: Ulmus americana L.Ulmus pumila Pallas NOT  L.
Accepted Name: Ulmus minorMill.Ulmus pumila Walter NOT  L.
Accepted Name: Ulmus alata Michx.Ulmus pumila f. androssowiiAccepted Name: Ulmus × androssowii R. KamUlmus pumila var. genuina Skvort.
Accepted Name: Ulmus pumila  L.Ulmus pumila var. microphylla Pers.
Accepted Name: Ulmus pumila  L.Ulmus pumila var. pilosa Rehder
Accepted Name: Ulmus chumlia Melville & HeybroekUlmus pumila var. pinnato-ramosa A.Henry
Accepted Name: Ulmus pumila 'Turkestan'Ulmus pumila var. transbaicalensis Pallas
Accepted Name: Ulmus pumila  L.Ulmus pumila 'Den Haag'
Accepted Name: Ulmus × 'Den Haag'Ulmus pumila 'Lincoln'
Accepted Name: Ulmus × 'Lincoln'Ulmus pumila 'Siber-Ansaloni' 
Accepted Name: Ulmus pumila 'Ansaloni'Ulmus pyramidalis C. de Vos
Accepted Name: Ulmus minor 'Stricta'Ulmus racemosa Borkh.
Accepted Name: Ulmus laevis Pall.Ulmus racemosa Thomas
Accepted Name: Ulmus thomasii Sarg.Ulmus reticulata Dumrt.
Accepted Name: Ulmus laevis Pall.Ulmus rosseelsii Hort. ex Dippel
Accepted Name: Ulmus minorMill.Ulmus rotundata (Hayne) Sloboda
Accepted Name: ? (Nomen dubium)Ulmus rotundifolia Carriere
Accepted Name: ? Ulmus macrocarpa ?Ulmus sarniensis Bancs., C.K.Schneid., Lodd., Boom
Accepted Name: Ulmus minor 'Sarniensis'Ulmus sativa Mill. NOT Moss
Accepted Name: Ulmus minor 'Atinia'Ulmus sativa Moss
Accepted Name: Ulmus minor 'Plotii'Ulmus sativa Mill. var. lockii Druce
Accepted Name: Ulmus minor 'Plotii'Ulmus sativa pendula C. de Vos
Accepted Name: Ulmus minor 'Pendula'Ulmus scabra Mill., C.K.Schneid., Ley, Asch. & Graebn.
Accepted Name: Ulmus glabra Huds.Ulmus scabra purpurea corylifolia Dieck
Accepted Name: Ulmus glabra 'Corylifolia Purpurea'Ulmus scabra purpurea nigricans Dieck
Accepted Name: Ulmus glabra 'Latifolia Nigricans' PynaertUlmus scabra viminalis gracilis Hort. Dieck
Accepted Name: Ulmus × viminalis Lodd.Ulmus scabra viminalis pulverulenta Hort. Dieck, Dippel
Accepted Name: Ulmus × viminalis Lodd.Ulmus scampstoniensis pendula Petz.
Accepted Name: Ulmus glabra 'Camperdownii'Ulmus scotica Gdgr.
Accepted Name: Ulmus glabra Huds.Ulmus sepearia Dumort.
Accepted Name: Ulmus minor Mill.Ulmus shirasawana Daveau
Accepted Name: Ulmus parvifolia Jacq.Ulmus sibirica Hort. Lavallée
Accepted Name: Ulmus pumila 'Pendula'Ulmus sieboldii Daveau
Accepted Name: Ulmus parvifolia Jacq.Ulmus sieboldii f. shirawasana (Daveau) Nakai
Accepted Name: Ulmus parvifolia Jacq.Ulmus simplicidens E. Wolf
Accepted Name: Ulmus laevis Pall.Ulmus smithii Henry
Accepted Name: Ulmus × hollandica 'Smithii'Ulmus sparsa Dumort.
Accepted Name: Ulmus minor Mill.Ulmus striata Bosc.
Accepted Name: ? (Nomen dubium)Ulmus stricta Aiton
Accepted Name: Ulmus minor Mill.Ulmus stricta Lindley
Accepted Name: Ulmus minor 'Stricta'Ulmus stricta Loudon
Accepted Name: Ulmus minor Mill.Ulmus stricta microphylla Lodd.
Accepted Name: Ulmus × hollandica 'Microphylla'Ulmus suberosa Moench.
Accepted Name: Ulmus minor Mill.Ulmus suberosa  Smith, Loudon, Lindley
Accepted Name: Ulmus minor 'Atinia'Ulmus suberosa Michx.
Accepted Name: Ulmus glabra Huds.Ulmus suberosa betuloides Hort. G.Kirchn.
Accepted Name: Ulmus × viminalis Lodd.Ulmus suberosa fastigiata Audibert
Accepted Name: Ulmus minor 'Stricta'Ulmus suberosa oxoniensis Audibert
Accepted Name: Ulmus 'Exoniensis'Ulmus suberosa pendula Lombartii (Floralia, 1920)
Accepted Name: ?Ulmus × hollandica or Ulmus minor? 'Lombartsii'Ulmus suberosa pendula Lombartsi (Lombarts Nursery)
Accepted Name: ?Ulmus × hollandica or Ulmus minor? 'Lombartsii'Ulmus suberosa tricolor C. de Vos
Accepted Name: Ulmus × hollandica 'Tricolor'Ulmus suberosa var. lanuginosa Lavallée
Accepted Name: Ulmus minor 'Lanuginosa'Ulmus sukaczevii Andronov
Accepted Name: Ulmus glabra Huds.Ulmus superba A. Henry
Accepted Name: Ulmus × hollandica 'Superba'Ulmus surculosa  Stokes
Accepted Name: Ulmus minor 'Atinia'Ulmus surculosa argutifolia  Stokes 
Accepted Name: Ulmus minor 'Plotii'Ulmus surculosa  Stokes var. latifolia  Stokes, Ley 
Accepted Name: Ulmus minor 'Atinia'Ulmus taihangshanensis S.Y.Wang
Accepted Name: Ulmus lamellosa Wang & S.L.ChangUlmus tetrandra Schuhr
Accepted Name: Ulmus minor  Mill.Ulmus 'Thornhill'
Accepted Name: Ulmus 'Morton' = Ulmus tiliaefolia (or tilliifolia) Host
Accepted Name: Ulmus glabra 'Tiliaefolia'Ulmus tomentosa G.Kirchn.
Accepted Name: Ulmus glabra 'Tomentosa'Ulmus tonkinensis Gagnep.
Accepted Name: Ulmus lanceifolia Roxburgh ex Wall.Ulmus 'Tortillard'
Accepted Name: Ulmus × hollandica 'Modiolina'Ulmus tortuosa Host
Accepted Name: Ulmus minor 'Tortuosa'Ulmus transbaicalensis Steud.
Accepted name: Ulmus pumila  L.Ulmus tricuspis Hort. ex Starcs
Accepted Name: Ulmus glabra Huds.Ulmus tridens Hort. ex. Dippel
Accepted Name: Ulmus glabra Huds.Ulmus triserrata Hort. ex Dippel
Accepted Name: Ulmus glabra 'Cornuta'Ulmus turkestanica Regel
Accepted Name: Ulmus minor 'Umbraculifera'Ulmus urnii (Siebenthaler Co. Cat.)
Accepted Name: Ulmus americana 'Vase'Ulmus urticaefolia Audibert
Accepted Name: Ulmus glabra 'Crispa'Ulmus urticaefolia Jacques
Accepted Name: Ulmus laevis 'Urticaefolia'Ulmus uzbekistanica Drob.
Accepted Name: Ulmus minor Mill.Ulmus vaseyi Bailey & Bailey
Accepted Name: Ulmus americana 'Vase'Ulmus vegeta Ley
Accepted Name: Ulmus × hollandica 'Vegeta'Ulmus viminalis pendula W.Mast.
Accepted Name: Ulmus × viminalis Lodd.Ulmus virens Hort. ex Dippel
Accepted Name: Ulmus minor Mill.Ulmus virens W.Mast.
Accepted Name: Ulmus × hollandica 'Virens'Ulmus virgata Roxburgh
Accepted Name: Ulmus parvifolia Jacq.Ulmus virgata Wallich. ex. Planch.
Accepted Name: Ulmus chumlia Melville & HeybroekUlmus viscosa Audibert, Lodd., Loudon
Accepted Name: Ulmus × hollandica 'Viscosa'Ulmus vulgaris Aiton
Accepted Name: Ulmus minor Mill.Ulmus vulgaris Pallas 
Accepted Name: Ulmus minor Mill.Ulmus wallichiana Brandis, Hooker
Accepted Name: Ulmus wallichiana Planch.Ulmus webbiana Lee ex K. Koch
Accepted Name: Ulmus 'Webbiana'Ulmus wentworthii pendula C. de Vos
Accepted Name: Ulmus 'Wentworthii'Ulmus 'Wheatley'
Accepted Name: Ulmus minor 'Sarniensis'Ulmus wheatleyii Druce
Accepted Name: Ulmus minor 'Sarniensis'Ulmus wilsoniana C.K.Schneid.
Accepted Name: Ulmus davidiana var. japonica (Rehder), NakaiUlmus wilsoniana Litw. var. subhirsuta  (C.K.Schneid.), P.H.Huang, F.Y.Cao, & L.H.Zhuo
Accepted Name: Ulmus chumlia Melville & HeybroekUlmus wilsoniana C.K.Schneid. 'Prospector'
Accepted Name: Ulmus davidiana var. japonica 'Prospector'Ulmus wreedi aurea Leach
Accepted Name: Ulmus × hollandica 'Wredei'Ulmus wyssotzky Kotov.
Accepted Name: Ulmus minor Mill.Ulmus xanthochondra Beck von Mannagette
Accepted Name: Ulmus minor Mill.Ulmus 'Ypreau' 
Accepted Name: Ulmus × hollandica 'Ypreau'Ulmus × hollandica var. belgicaAccepted Name: Ulmus × hollandica 'Belgica'Ulmus × hollandica var. vegeta sensu Rehder
Accepted Name: Ulmus × hollandica 'Vegeta'Ulmus × hollandica 'Hollandica'
Accepted Name: Ulmus × hollandica 'Major'Ulmus × hollandica 'Christine Buisman' 
Accepted Name: Ulmus minor 'Christine Buisman'Ulmus × vegeta Loud.
Accepted Name: Ulmus × hollandica 'Vegeta'
}}

References

Bean, W. J. (1981). Trees and shrubs hardy in Great Britain, 7th edition. Murray, London.
Brummitt, R. K. (1992). Vascular Plant Families & Genera. Royal Botanic Garden, Kew, London, UK.
Elwes, H. J. & Henry, A. (1913). The Trees of Great Britain & Ireland. Vol. VII. pp 1848–1929. Private publication 
Fu, L., Xin, Y. & Whittemore, A. (2002). Ulmaceae, in Wu, Z. & Raven, P. (eds) Flora of China, Vol. 5 (Ulmaceae through Basellaceae). Science Press, Beijing, and Missouri Botanical Garden Press, St. Louis, USA. 
Masters, W. (1831). Hortus Duroverni 1831. Longman, Rees, Orme, Brown & Green, London.
Melville, R. & Heybroek, H. (1971). Elms of the Himalaya. Kew Bulletin, Vol. 26 (1). Kew, London.
Richens, R. H. (1983). Elm''. Cambridge University Press.

Ulmus